Lancun Road is an interchange station between Lines 4 and 6 on the Shanghai Metro, located in the Pudong New Area. Service began on Line 4 at this station on 31 December 2005, while the interchange with Line 6 opened with most of the rest of that line on 29 December 2007. Between 31 December 2005 and 29 December 2007 this station served as the eastern terminus of Line 4 before the remaining section of the loop between here and Damuqiao Road opened on 29 December 2007.

Station Layout

References

Railway stations in Shanghai
Shanghai Metro stations in Pudong
Line 4, Shanghai Metro
Line 6, Shanghai Metro
Railway stations in China opened in 2005